Gadsden is a census-designated place (CDP) in Yuma County, Arizona, United States. The population was 953 at the 2000 census. It is part of the Yuma Metropolitan Statistical Area.

Geography
Gadsden is located at  (32.557903, -114.783280).

Demographics

As of the census of 2000, there were 953 people, 236 households, and 206 families residing in the CDP. The racial makeup of the CDP was 40.9% White, 3.6% Native American, 0.3% Asian, 0.2% Pacific Islander, 53.6% from other races, and 1.4% from two or more races.  93.8% of the population were Hispanic or Latino of any race.

There were 236 households, out of which 61.0% had children under the age of 18 living with them, 67.4% were married couples living together, 15.3% had a female householder with no husband present, and 12.7% were non-families. 11.9% of all households were made up of individuals, and 4.2% had someone living alone who was 65 years of age or older.  The average household size was 4.04 and the average family size was 4.39.

In the CDP, the population was spread out, with 39.3% under the age of 18, 10.7% from 18 to 24, 27.8% from 25 to 44, 15.8% from 45 to 64, and 6.3% who were 65 years of age or older.  The median age was 25 years. For every 100 females, there were 102.3 males.  For every 100 females age 18 and over, there were 95.9 males.

The median income for a household in the CDP was $21,000, and the median income for a family was $21,000. Males had a median income of $18,365 versus $16,875 for females. The per capita income for the CDP was $6,562.  About 41.7% of families and 45.2% of the population were below the poverty line, including 51.8% of those under age 18 and 12.1% of those age 65 or over.

References

Census-designated places in Yuma County, Arizona